Samuel Kent Harris (born June 4, 1961) is an American pop and theater musician as well as a television, theater and film actor.

Career

Singing
Harris got his start as the grand champion singer of Star Search in its premiere season in 1983. He gained acclaim and became best known for his winning rendition of the song "Over the Rainbow" on the show. "Over the Rainbow" has since become his signature song.  His appearance on Star Search led to him landing a contract with Motown Records. His first single, "Sugar Don't Bite", was a Top 40 hit, reaching #36 on the Billboard Hot 100 chart in November 1984. "Over the Rainbow" was released in Australia and peaked at number 65 in 1985.

He is a multi-million selling recording artist with nine studio albums to his credit. He can also be heard on numerous concert, guest artist, and cast recordings. He has toured extensively in concert and has played to sold-out audiences at major venues including New York's Carnegie Hall, Los Angeles' Universal Amphitheatre, and London's West End. He has appeared with the Boston Pops Orchestra, at the White House, and has sung on a variety of television specials and live productions. On February 12, 2008, he released a new single entitled "War on War" that became an Internet phenomenon with music videos made by the general public. The song became a part of his album, Free, which was released that summer. The single "Change Is On The Way" was written to support the Obama campaign and was heard on numerous television shows and behind Internet videos around the time of the election. In 2010, Sam wrote and released "My Reclamation", which has become an anthem for marriage equality. Harris was cited by Rolling Stone magazine as "One of the greatest 100 singers of all time."

Stage
On Broadway, he received a Drama Desk nomination for his role in the Jeff Calhoun-directed revival of Grease, and a Drama League Award as well as Tony, Outer Critic's Circle and Drama Desk Award nominations for his work in Cy Coleman's Tony-nominated musical The Life. He's also appeared on Broadway in Mel Brooks' Tony Award-winning musical The Producers, in the national tour of Joseph and the Amazing Technicolor Dreamcoat, and in the musicals Jesus Christ Superstar, Cabaret, Hair, and Pippin and "The First Wives Club". . He also starred in the self-penned shows Hardcopy, Different Hats, Revival and the critically acclaimed SAM. Harris's most recent show was Ham: A Musical Memoir which played in New York and Los Angeles. The Los Angeles run received Ovation Awards for Best Musical, Best Actor (Harris), and Best Musical Director (for Todd Schroeder.)

Films
Harris has appeared in three feature films to date: In the Weeds (2000, as Jonathan), the documentary Little Man (2005, as himself) and Elena Undone (2010, as Tyler).

Television
Harris co-created the television series Down to Earth (1984, which ran for four years and 104 episodes). In addition to his now iconic performances on "Star Search" he was a series regular on The Class (2006-2007 - Perry Pearl). In 1986-87, Harris was one of several "Star Search" alumni who performed the contestants' songs on the songwriting competition series  You Write the Songs with Harris singing the winning song "Everybody Needs A Dream" by songwriter Tom Grose (also a "Star Search" alumnus with his band The Varsity.)  Harris is also credited on Rules of Engagement  (Jackie, recurring),  The Wayne Brady Show, CSI (Alan Widcom), Major Crimes (Jason) among others. He was music supervisor on Michael Jackson: 30th Anniversary Celebration (2001), and has also appeared on numerous talk shows including The Rosie O'Donnell Show (1997 and 2000 - three episodes), The Tonight Show with Jay Leno (1994), Brunch (co-host (2006), The Oprah Winfrey Show (1997 and 2001 - two episodes), Dr. Phil'''s 500th episode (2005), The View (2007 - one episode), The Tyra Banks Show (2010), The Dr. Drew Show (2011) and "Late Night With Jimmy Fallon".

Author
In 2014, Harris penned a collection of autobiographical essays and stories entitled Ham - Slices of a Life which was published by Simon & Schuster/Gallery Books, and received unanimous critical praise. Harris subsequently adapted the book into an Off-off-Broadway solo performance, HAM: A Musical Memoir.

In 2020, Harris released his second book, a novel entitled The Substance of All Things.

Personal life
Sam Harris left his home in Oklahoma at the age of 15 to pursue a theater career, finished high school through correspondence courses, and briefly attended the University of California, Los Angeles, where he received the Frank Sinatra Pop Singing Award.

Harris and Danny Jacobsen, who is a director and presentation coach for numerous blue-chip companies and also a film producer, have been together since 1994. In 2008, they adopted a son, Cooper Atticus Harris-Jacobsen, and then the couple married.

Stage workJesus Christ Superstar (1990)Joseph and the Amazing Technicolor Dreamcoat (1994)Grease (1994)The Life (1997)The Producers (2002)SAM. (2003)The Jazz Singer (1998) (workshop)Hair (2000)Funny Girl (2002) (benefit concert)Mack & Mabel (2003) (benefit concert)Pippin (2005)The First Wives Club (2009)Ham: A Musical Memoir'' (2014-2015)

References

External links
 
 
 

1961 births
Living people
20th-century American male actors
20th-century American singers
21st-century American male actors
21st-century American singers
American male film actors
American male musical theatre actors
American male pop singers
American male television actors
Motown artists
American gay actors
American gay musicians
LGBT people from Oklahoma
American LGBT singers
Male actors from Oklahoma
Singers from Oklahoma
People from Cushing, Oklahoma
20th-century American male singers
21st-century American male singers
20th-century American LGBT people
21st-century American LGBT people